Subang Alam LRT station is a Light Rapid Transit station at Subang Alam in Shah Alam, Selangor. The Subang Alam station is located near Sekolah Kebangsaan Alam Megah 2. The station serves the nearby Subang Alam and Aroma Tropika neighbourhoods in Shah Alam, Selangor.

It is operated under the Kelana Jaya LRT system network as found in the station signage. Like most other LRT stations operating in Klang Valley, this station is elevated.

Feeder bus service

External links 
Subang Alam LRT station

Kelana Jaya Line
Railway stations opened in 2016